"Heaven Is" is a song by English hard rock band Def Leppard from their 1992 album, Adrenalize. The single was released in January 1993 and reached number 13 in the United Kingdom.

Song information
In a statement on the Rock of Ages: The Definitive Collection and Best of Def Leppard compilation albums, the band's lead singer Joe Elliott described the song's backing vocals on the chorus sounded much like The Beach Boys, and said that it was the first time Def Leppard went that far. He also described the song as being "More Queen than Queen". Lead guitarist Phil Collen said that this song had been around for years and that parts of it were taken from the song "Armageddon It".

Video
According to a Joe Elliott statement on the Rock of Ages: The Definitive Collection, Best of Def Leppard and Vault: Def Leppard Greatest Hits (1980-1995) compilation albums, he hated the music video.

Track listing
CD: Bludgeon Riffola / LEPCD 9 (UK) / 864 731-2 (INT)
 "Heaven Is"
 "She's Too Tough"
 "Elected" (Live) (Alice Cooper cover)
 "Let's Get Rocked" (Live)

"Elected" was recorded at Tilburg, Netherlands in 1987; "Let's Get Rocked" was recorded at Bonn, Germany on 29 May 1992

7": Bludgeon Riffola / LEP 9 (UK) / INT 864 730-7 / Special Edition Autographed Etched Disk 
This single has the band members autographs on the back side of the disc.
 "Heaven Is"
 "She's Too Tough"

12": Bludgeon Riffola / LEPX 9 (UK) / INT 864 731-1 / Picture Disc 
This 12" single picture disc has the Adrenalize graphic exploding in the cover. On the back side of the picture disc has a picture of Joe Elliott. The back cardboard has the 12" single information and a band picture. Pictures by Ross Halfin. Artwork and Design by Andie Airfix at Satori.
 "Heaven Is"
 "She's Too Tough"
 "Let's Get Rocked" (Live)

Charts

References

Def Leppard songs
1992 songs
1993 singles
Songs written by Robert John "Mutt" Lange
Songs written by Joe Elliott
Songs written by Phil Collen
Songs written by Steve Clark
Songs written by Rick Savage